John L. Kinsey School is a former K-8 school located in the West Oak Lane neighborhood of Philadelphia, Pennsylvania. It was a part of the School District of Philadelphia. As of 2017, the school building is now home to Building 21, a public high school in the innovative school district network.

It was designed by Henry deCoursey Richards and built by Cramp & Co. in 1915–1916.  It is a four-story, seven bay reinforced concrete and brick building on a raised basement in Late Gothic Revival-style.  It features a projecting entrance bay and limestone and terra cotta decorative details.

History
It was added to the National Register of Historic Places in 1986.

The district closed Kinsey in 2013. The possible options for students after the closure were Rowen Elementary School, Prince Hall Elementary School, Pastorius Elementary School, Pennell Elementary School, and Gen. Louis Wagner Middle School.

Feeder patterns
Kinsey students were zoned to King High School.

References

External links
  - 2009
  - 1999-2005

School buildings on the National Register of Historic Places in Philadelphia
Gothic Revival architecture in Pennsylvania
School buildings completed in 1916
West Oak Lane, Philadelphia
1916 establishments in Pennsylvania